Jean-Jacques de Peretti (born 21 September 1946) is a French politician who has served as mayor of Sarlat-la-Canéda since 1989.

References 

1946 births
French Ministers of Overseas France
Living people
Recipients of the Legion of Honour
Politicians from Clermont-Ferrand